Bharat Mohan Adhikari (4 May 1936 – 2 March 2019) was a Nepali politician and freedom fighter. He became the Minister of Finance of Nepal in the 1994-95 government of Prime Minister Man Mohan Adhikari. He was the first communist Finance Minister who championed the "Afno Gaun Afai Banau" (Develop our own village) campaign. 

He also served as  the deputy prime minister of Nepal in the Deuba cabinet (2004–05), which was later dissolved by King Gyanendra. Although a central figure of the CPN-UML, he was considered to have held more moderate views.

Health and death 
In 2012, he was at the Medanta Medicity Hospital in New Delhi for suspected valvular heart disease, but was not treated for the same. He died on 2 March 2019 from multiple organ failure stemming from a severe case of COPD.

References

External links
Bharat Mohan Adhikari talks to Nepali Headlines on YouTube

Further reading
Interview with Bharat Mohan Adhikari on New Spotlight

1936 births
2019 deaths
Government ministers of Nepal
People from Biratnagar
Finance ministers of Nepal
Nepal MPs 1991–1994
Nepal MPs 1999–2002
Khas people
Members of the 2nd Nepalese Constituent Assembly
Nepal MPs 1994–1999